The Kartu languages is a group of Indigenous Australian languages spoken in the Murchison and Gascoyne regions of Western Australia. They are thought to be closely related and to form a low-level genealogical group.

The languages usually considered to be members of the Kartu group are, from north to south:

 Yinggarda
 Malgana
? Nhanda (possibly also Nhanhagardi)
 Wajarri
 Badimaya

The inclusion of Nhanda is dubious. It was excluded in Bowern & Koch (2004), but retained in Bowern (2011). Thaagurda was apparently also a Kartu language.

The name kartu comes from the word for 'man' in one of the languages. In some earlier work the word was spelled 'kardu'.

The Kartu languages form a branch of the Pama–Nyungan family.

References

External links 
Handbook of WA Aboriginal Languages south of the Kimberley -- family tree